Several common ethanol fuel mixtures are in use around the world. The use of pure hydrous or anhydrous ethanol in internal combustion engines (ICEs) is only possible if the engines are designed or modified for that purpose, and used only in automobiles, light-duty trucks and motorcycles. Anhydrous ethanol can be blended with :gasoline (petrol) for use in gasoline engines, but with high ethanol content only after  engine modifications to meter increased fuel volume since pure ethanol contains only 2/3 of the BTUs of an equivalent volume of pure gasoline. High percentage ethanol mixtures are used in some racing engine applications as the very high octane rating of ethanol is compatible with very high compression ratios.

Ethanol fuel mixtures have "E" numbers which describe the percentage of ethanol fuel in the mixture by volume, for example, E85 is 85% anhydrous ethanol and 15% gasoline. Low-ethanol blends are typically from E5 to E25, although internationally the most common use of the term refers to the E10 blend.

Blends of E10 or less are used in more than 20 countries around the world, led by the United States, where ethanol represented 10% of the U.S. gasoline fuel supply in 2011.  Blends from E20 to E25 have been used in Brazil since the late 1970s. E85 is commonly used in the U.S. and Europe for flexible-fuel vehicles. Hydrous ethanol or E100 is used in Brazilian neat ethanol vehicles and flex-fuel light vehicles and hydrous E15 called hE15 for modern petrol cars in the Netherlands.

E10 or less 

E10, a fuel mixture of 10% anhydrous ethanol and 90% gasoline sometimes called gasohol, can be used in the internal combustion engines of most modern automobiles and light-duty vehicles without need for any modification on the engine or fuel system. E10 blends are typically rated as being 2 to 3 octane numbers higher than regular gasoline and are approved for use in all new U.S. automobiles, and mandated in some areas for emissions and other reasons. The E10 blend and lower ethanol content mixtures have been used in several countries, and its use has been primarily driven by the several world energy shortages that have taken place since the 1973 oil crisis.

Other common blends include E5 and E7. These concentrations are generally safe for recent engines that should run on pure gasoline. As of 2006, mandates for blending bioethanol into vehicle fuels had been enacted in at least 36 states/provinces and 17 countries at the national level, with most mandates requiring a blend of 10 to 15% ethanol with gasoline.

One measure of alternative fuels in the U.S. is the "gasoline-equivalent gallon" (GEG). In 2002, the U.S. used as motor fuel, ethanol equal to 137,000 terajoules (TJ), the energy equivalent of 1.13 billion U.S. gallons (4.3 billion liters) of gasoline. This was less than 1% of the total fuel used that year.

E10 and other blends of ethanol are considered to be useful in decreasing U.S. dependence on foreign oil, and can reduce carbon monoxide (CO) emissions by 20 to 30% under the right conditions. Although E10 does decrease emissions of CO and greenhouse gases such as CO2 by an estimated 2% over regular gasoline, it can cause increases in evaporative emissions and some pollutants depending on factors such as the age of the vehicle and weather conditions.  According to the Philippine Department of Energy, the use of up to 10% ethanol-gasoline mixture is not harmful to cars' fuel systems. Generally, automobile gasoline containing alcohol (ethanol or methanol) is not recommended to be used in aircraft.

Availability 

 E10 became the standard fuel at petrol stations in the United Kingdom as of September 2021. E5 is still an option for drivers who wish to fuel incompatible cars but is decreasing in availability. 
 E10 was introduced nationwide in Thailand in 2007, and replaced 91 octane pure gasoline in that country in 2013.
 E10 is commonly available in the Midwestern United States. It was also mandated for use in all standard automobile fuel in the state of Florida by the end of 2010. Due to the phasing out of MTBE as a gasoline additive and mainly due to the mandates established in the Energy Policy Act of 2005 and the Energy Independence and Security Act of 2007, ethanol blends have increased throughout the United States, and by 2009, the ethanol market share in the U.S. gasoline supply reached almost 8% by volume.
 Many petrol stations throughout Australia sell E10, typically at a few cents cheaper per litre than regular unleaded. It is more commonly found throughout the state of Queensland due to its large sugarcane farming regions. The use of E10 is also subsidised by the Queensland government.  Many petrol stations are either slowly phasing out or already do not offer a "Regular 91" petrol option, instead only offering Regular E10 (91 or 94 depending on brand), Premium (95) and Premium (98), although regular unleaded still remains commonly available in Victoria and New South Wales.
 In Sweden, all 95-octane gasoline is E10 (6 to 10 percent of ethanol) since 1 August 2021, when the proportion of ethanol was increased from E5. In the early-mid-1990s, some fuel chains also sold E10. All newer and many older petrol cars bought in Sweden should handle this, since from January 2011, the Fuel Quality Directive (Directive 2009/30/EC) applied through its transposition into the law of Sweden as a member of the 27 member states of the EU. Older petrol cars should be compatible with 98-octane fuel, which includes maximum 5 percent of ethanol, often much less. The product data sheets of the major fuel chains has not clearly stated ethanol content of their 98-octane gasoline, but it varies between places.   

 From January 2011, all 95-octane fuel in Finland is E10, and 98E5 octane fuel is also available.
 Mandatory blending of ethanol was approved in Mozambique, but the percentage in the blend has not been specified.
 South Africa approved a biofuel strategy in 2007, and mandated an 8% blend of ethanol by 2013.
 A 2007 Uruguayan law mandates a minimum of 5% of ethanol blended with gasoline starting in January 2015. The monopolic, state-owned fuel producer ANCAP started blending premium gasoline with 10% of bioethanol in December 2009, which will be available in all the country by early January 2010. The other two gasolines will follow later in 2010.
The Dominican Republic has a mandate for blending 15% of ethanol by 2015.
Chile is considering the introduction of E5, and Panama, Bolivia and Venezuela of E10.
India achieved the target of 10 percent ethanol blending, 5 months ahead of schedule, in June 2022.
From January 2018, all 92-octane fuel in Vietnam is mandated to contain 5 percent ethanol (E5). No ethanol blending is required for 95-octane fuel. 

A 2011 study conducted by VTT Technical Research Centre of Finland found practically no difference in fuel consumption in normal driving conditions between commercial gasoline grades 95E10 and 98E5 sold in Finland, despite the public perception that fuel consumption is significantly higher with 95E10. The difference was 0.07 in favor of 98E5 on average, meaning that using 95E10 gasoline, which has a higher ethanol content, increases consumption by 0.7%. When the measurements are normalized, the difference becomes 1.0%, a result that is highly consistent with an estimation of calorific values based on approximate fuel composition, which came out at 1.1% in favour of E5.

E15 

E15 contains 15% ethanol and 85% gasoline. This is generally the highest ratio of ethanol to gasoline that is possible to use in vehicles recommended by some auto manufacturers to run on E10 in the US. This is due to ethanol's hydrophilia and solvent power.

As a result of the Energy Independence and Security Act of 2007, which mandates an increase in renewable fuels for the transport sector, the U.S. Department of Energy began assessments for the feasibility of using intermediate ethanol blends in the existing vehicle fleet as a way to allow higher consumption of ethanol fuel. The National Renewable Energy Laboratory (NREL) conducted tests to evaluate the potential impacts of intermediate ethanol blends on legacy vehicles and other engines. In a preliminary report released in October 2008, the NREL presented the results of the first evaluations of the effects of E10, E15 and E20 gasoline blends on tailpipe and evaporative emissions, catalyst and engine durability, vehicle driveability, engine operability, and vehicle and engine materials.

Other sources make the opposite claim about fuel economy.  According to Consumer Reports, "ethanol isn’t as energy-dense as regular gasoline so you will see worse fuel economy with E15 gas.” 

In March 2009, a lobbying group from the ethanol industry, Growth Energy, formally requested the U.S. Environmental Protection Agency (EPA) to allow the ethanol content in gasoline to be increased to 15% from 10%. Organizations doing such studies included the Energy Department, the State of Minnesota, the Renewable Fuels Association, the Rochester Institute of Technology, the Minnesota Center for Automotive Research, and Stockholm University in Sweden.

In October 2010, the EPA granted a waiver to allow up to 15% of ethanol blended with gasoline to be sold only for cars and light pickup trucks with a model year of 2007 or later, representing about 15% of vehicles on U.S. roads. In January 2011, the waiver was expanded to authorize use of E15 to include model year 2001 through 2006 passenger vehicles. The EPA also decided not to grant any waiver for E15 use in any motorcycles, heavy-duty vehicles, or nonroad engines because current testing data do not support such a waiver. According to the Renewable Fuels Association, the E15 waivers now cover 62% of vehicles on the road in the US, and the ethanol group estimates if all 2001 and newer cars and pickups were to use E15, the theoretical blend wall for ethanol use would be approximately 17.5 billion gallons (66.2 billion liters) per year. The EPA was still studying if older cars can withstand a 15% ethanol blend.

The EPA waiver authorizes sale of E15 only from Sep 15 to May 31 out of a black hose and a yellow hose to flex fuel vehicles only from June 1 to Sep 14.  Retailers have shunned building infrastructure due to the costly regulatory requirements which have created a practical barrier to the commercialization of the higher blend. Most fuel stations do not have enough pumps to offer the new blend, few existing pumps are certified to dispense E15, and no dedicated tanks are readily available to store E15. Also, some state and federal regulations would have to change before E15 can be legally sold. The  National Association of Convenience Stores, which represents most gasoline retailers, considers the potential for actual E15 demand is small, "because the auto industry is not embracing the fuel and is not adjusting their warranties or recommendations for the fuel type." One possible solution to the infrastructure barriers is the introduction of blender pumps that allow consumers to turn a dial to select the level of ethanol, which would also allow owners of flexible-fuel cars to buy E85 fuel.

In June 2011 EPA, in cooperation with the Federal Trade Commission, issued its final ruling regarding the E15 warning label required to be displayed in all E15 fuel dispensers in the U.S. to inform consumers about what vehicles can, and what vehicles and equipment cannot, use the E15 blend. Both the Alliance of Automobile Manufacturers and the National Petrochemical and Refiners Association complained that relying solely on this warning label is not enough to protect consumers from misfueling. In July 2012, a fueling station in Lawrence, Kansas became the first in the U.S. to sell the E15 blend. The fuel is sold through a blender pump that allows customers to choose between E10, E15, E30 or E85, with the latter blends sold only to flexible-fuel vehicles. , there are about 24 fueling stations selling E15 out of 180,000 stations across the U.S.

In December 2010, several groups, including the Alliance of Automobile Manufacturers, the American Petroleum Institute, the Association of International Automobile Manufacturers, the National Marine Manufacturers Association, the Outdoor Power Equipment Institute, and the Grocery Manufacturers Association, filed suit against the EPA in the United States Court of Appeals for the District of Columbia Circuit. The plaintiffs argued the EPA does not have the authority to issue a “partial waiver” that covers some cars and not others. Among other arguments, the groups argued that the higher ethanol blend is not only a problem for cars, but also for fuel pumps and underground tanks not designed for the E15 mixture. It was also argued that the rise in ethanol has contributed to the big jump in corn prices in recent years. In August 2012, the federal appeals court rejected the suit against the EPA. The case was thrown out on a technical reason, as the court ruled the groups did not have legal standing to challenge EPA's decision to issue the waiver for E15. In June 2013 the U.S. Supreme Court declined to hear an appeal from industry groups opposed to the EPA ruling about E15, and let the 2012 federal appeals court ruling stand.

, sales of E15 are not authorized in California, and according to the California Air Resources Board (CARB), the blend is still awaiting approval, and in a public statement the agency said that "it would take several years to complete the vehicle testing and rule development necessary to introduce a new transportation fuel into California's market."

According to a survey conducted by the American Automobile Association (AAA) in 2012, only about 12 million out of the more than 240 million light-duty vehicles on the U.S. roads in 2012 are approved by manufacturers are fully compliant with E15 gasoline. According with the Association, BMW, Chrysler, Nissan, Toyota, and Volkswagen warned that their warranties will not cover E15-related damage. Despite the controversy, in order to adjust to EPA regulations, 2012 and 2013 model year vehicles manufactured by General Motors can use fuel containing up to 15 percent ethanol, as indicated in the vehicle owners' manuals. However, the carmaker warned that for model year 2011 or earlier vehicles, they "strongly recommend that GM customers refer to their owners manuals for the proper fuel designation for their vehicles." Ford Motor Company also is manufacturing all of its 2013 vehicles E15 compatible, including hybrid electrics and vehicles with Ecoboost engines. Also Porsches built since 2001 are approved by its manufacturer to use E15. Volkswagen announced that for the 2014 model year, its entire lineup will be E15 capable. Fiat Chrysler Automobiles announced in August 2015 that all 2016 model year Chrysler/Fiat, Jeep, Dodge and Ram vehicles will be E15 compatible.

In November 2013, the Environmental Protection Agency opened for public comment its proposal to reduce the amount of ethanol required in the U.S. gasoline supply as mandated by the Energy Independence and Security Act of 2007. The agency cited problems with increasing the blend of ethanol above 10%. This limit, known as the "blend wall," refers to the practical difficulty in incorporating increasing amounts of ethanol into the transportation fuel supply at volumes exceeding those achieved by the sale of nearly all gasoline as E10.

hE15 

A 15% hydrous ethanol and 85% gasoline blend, hE15, has been introduced at public gas stations in the Netherlands since 2008. Ethanol fuel specifications worldwide traditionally dictate use of anhydrous ethanol (less than 1% water) for gasoline blending. This results in additional costs, energy usage and environmental impacts associated with the extra processing step required to dehydrate the hydrous ethanol produced via distillation (3.5-4.9 vol.% water) to meet the current anhydrous ethanol specifications. A patented discovery reveals hydrous ethanol can be effectively used in most ethanol/gasoline blending applications.

According to the Brazilian ANP specification, hydrous ethanol contains up to 4.9 vol.% water. In hE15, this would be up to 0.74 vol.% water in the overall mixture. Japanese and German scientific evidence revealed the water is an inhibitor for corrosion by ethanol.

The experiments show that water in fuel ethanol inhibits dry corrosion. At 10,000 ppm water in the E50 experiments by JARI and 3,500 ppm water in the E20 experiments by TU Darmstadt  the alcoholate/alkoxide corrosion stopped. In the fuel ethanol this resembles 20,000 ppm or 2 volume% in the case of JARI and 5 x 3500 = 17,500 ppm of 1.75 volume% in the case of TU Darmstadt. The observations are in line with the fact that hydrous ethanol is known for being less corrosive than anhydrous ethanol. The reaction mechanism will be the same at lower-mid blends. When enough water is present in the fuel, the aluminum will react preferably with water to produce aluminum oxide, repairing the protective aluminum oxide layer, which is why the corrosion stops. The aluminum alcoholate/alkoxide does not make a tight oxide layer, which is why the corrosion continues. In other words, water is essential to repair the holes in the oxide layer. Based on the Japanese/German results, a minimum of 2 vol.% or 2.52% m/m water is currently proposed in the revision of the hydrous ethanol specification for blending in petrol at E10+ levels. Water injection has additional positive effects on the engine performance (thermodynamic efficiency) and reduces overall CO2 emissions.

Overall, a transition from anhydrous to hydrous ethanol for gasoline blending is expected to make a significant contribution to ethanol's cost-competitiveness, fuel cycle net energy balance, air quality, and greenhouse gas emissions.

The level of blending above 10% (V/V) is chosen both from a technical (safety) perspective and to distinguish the product in Europe from regular unleaded petrol for reasons of taxes and customer clarity. Small-scale tests have shown many vehicles with modern engine types can run smoothly on this hydrous ethanol blend. Mixed tanking scenarios with anhydrous ethanol blends at 5% or 10% level do not induce phase separation. As avoiding mixing with E0, in particular at extremely low temperatures, in logistic systems and engines is not recommended, a separate specification for controlled usage is presented in a Netherlands Technical Agreement NTA 8115. The NTA 8115 is written for a worldwide application in trading and fuel blending.

E20, E25

E20 contains 20% ethanol and 80% gasoline, while E25 contains 25% ethanol. These blends have been widely used in Brazil since the late 1970s. As a response to the 1973 oil crisis, the Brazilian government made mandatory the blend of ethanol fuel with gasoline, fluctuating between 10% to 22% from 1976 until 1992. Due to this mandatory minimum gasoline blend, pure gasoline (E0) is no longer sold in Brazil. A federal law was passed in October 1993 establishing a mandatory blend of 22% anhydrous ethanol (E22) in the entire country. This law also authorized the Executive to set different percentages of ethanol within pre-established boundaries, and since 2003, these limits were fixed at a maximum of 25% (E25) and a minimum of 20% (E20) by volume. Since then, the government has set the percentage on the ethanol blend according to the results of the sugarcane harvest and ethanol production from sugarcane, resulting in blend variations even within the same year.

Since July 1, 2007, the mandatory blend was set at 25% of anhydrous ethanol (E25) by executive decree, and this has been the standard gasoline blend sold throughout Brazil most of the time as of 2011. However, as a result of a supply shortage and the resulting high ethanol fuel prices, in 2010, the government mandated a temporary 90-day blend reduction from E25 to E20 beginning February 1, 2010. As prices rose abruptly again due to supply shortages that took place again between the 2010 and 2011 harvest seasons, some ethanol had to be imported from the United States, and in April 2011, the government reduced the minimum mandatory blend to 18%, leaving the mandatory blend range between E18 and E25.

All Brazilian automakers have adapted their gasoline engines to run smoothly with this range of mixtures, thus, all gasoline vehicles are built to run with blends from E20 to E25, defined by local law as "common gasoline type C". Some vehicles might work properly with lower concentrations of ethanol, but with a few exceptions, they are unable to run smoothly with pure gasoline, which causes engine knocking, as vehicles traveling to neighboring South American countries have demonstrated. Flex-fuel vehicles, which can run on any type of gasoline E20-E25 up to 100% hydrous ethanol (E100 or hydrated ethanol) ratios, were first available in mid-2003. In July 2008, 86% of all new light vehicles sold in Brazil were flexible-fuel, and only two carmakers build models with a flex-fuel engine optimized to operate with pure gasoline (E0): Renault with the models Clio, Symbol, Logan, Sandero and Mégane, and Fiat with the Siena Tetrafuel.

Thailand introduced E20 in 2008, but shortages in ethanol supplies by mid-2008 caused a delay in the expansion of the E20 fueling station network in the country. By mid-2010, 161 fueling stations were selling E20, and sales have risen 80% since April 2009. The rapid growth in E20 demand is because most vehicle models launched since 2009 were E20-compatible, and sales of E20 are expected to grow faster once more local automakers start producing small, E20-compatible, fuel-efficient cars. The Thai government is promoting ethanol usage through subsidies, as ethanol costs four baht (about 12 US cents) a litre more than gasoline.

A state law approved in Minnesota in 2005 mandated that ethanol comprise 20% of all gasoline sold in this American state beginning in 2013. Successful tests have been conducted to determine the performance under E20 by current vehicles and fuel dispensing equipment designed for E10. However, this mandate was later delayed to 2015, and has never taken effect because the federal EPA has yet to authorize the use of E20 as a replacement for gasoline.

A study commissioned by BP and published in September 2013, concluded that the use of advanced biofuels in the UK, and particularly E20 cellulosic ethanol, is a more cost-effective way of reducing emissions than using plug-in electric vehicles (PEVs) in the timeframe to 2030. The study also found that the use of higher blends of biofuels is complementary to hybrid electric vehicles (HEVs) and plug-in hybrids (PHEVs). Battery electric vehicles (BEVs) can deliver strong CO2 savings with a decarbonised electric grid, but are expected to have significantly higher costs than internal combustion engine vehicles and hybrid cars to 2030, as the latter are expected to be the most popular models by 2030.

E70, E75 

E70 contains 70% ethanol and 30% gasoline, while E75 contains 75% ethanol. These winter blends are used in the United States and Sweden for E85 flexible-fuel vehicles during the cold weather, but still sold at the pump labeled as E85. The seasonal reduction of the ethanol content to an E85 winter blend is mandated to avoid cold starting problems at low temperatures.

In the US, this seasonal reduction of the ethanol content to E70 applies only in cold regions, where temperatures fall below  during the winter. In Wyoming for example, E70 is sold as E85 from October to May. In Sweden, all E85 flexible-fuel vehicles use an E75 winter blend. This blend was introduced since the winter 2006-07 and E75 is used from November until March.

For temperatures below , all E85 flex vehicles require an engine block heater to avoid cold starting problems. The use of this device is also recommended for gasoline vehicles when temperatures drop below . Another option when extreme cold weather is expected is to add more pure gasoline in the tank, thus reducing the ethanol content below the E70 winter blend, or simply not to use E85 during extreme low temperature spells.

E85 

E85, a mixture of 85% ethanol and ~15% gasoline, is generally the highest ethanol fuel mixture found in the United States and several European countries, particularly in Sweden, as this blend is the standard fuel for flexible-fuel vehicles. This mixture has an octane rating of 108, however, the Ethanol molecule also carries with it an oxygen atom, where-as gasoline does not, effectively requiring the internal combustion engine to ingest less air per unit-volume by its own accord, which reduces pumping losses, and further increases the exo-thermic chemical reaction. Ethanol fuel is considered – although not widely known as – a form of "chemical supercharging", similar to that of Nitrous Oxide (N2O) & Nitromethane (CH3NO2).

A further reduction in the ethanol content is used during the winter in regions where temperatures fall below  and this blend is called Winter E85, as the fuel is still sold under the E85 label. A winter blend of E70 is mandated in some regions in the US, while Sweden mandates E75. Some regions in the United States now allow E51 (51% ethanol, 49% gasoline) to be sold as E85 in the winter months.

As of October 2010, nearly 3,000 E85 fuel pumps were in Europe, led by Sweden with 1,699 filling stations. The United States had 3,354 public E85 fuel pumps located in 2,154 cities by August 2014, mostly concentrated in the Midwest.

Thailand introduced E85 fuel by the end of 2008, and by mid-2010, only four E85 filling stations were available, with plans to expand to 15 stations by 2012.

A major restriction hampering sales of E85 flex vehicles or fuelling with E85, is the limited infrastructure available to sell E85 to the public, as by 2014 only 2 percent of motor fuel stations offered E85, up from about 1 percent in 2011. , there were only 3,218 gasoline fueling stations selling E85 to the public in the entire U.S., while about 156,000 retail motor fuel outlets do not offer the E85 blend. The number of E85 grew from 1,229 in 2007 to 2,442 in 2011, but only increased by 7% from 2011 to 2013, when the total reached 2,625. Only eight states do not have E85 available to the public, Alaska, Delaware, Hawaii, Montana, Maine, New Hampshire,  Rhode Island, and Vermont. A study conducted by the U.S. Department of Energy concluded that every service station in America could be converted to handle E85 at a cost of $3.4 billion to $10.1 billion.

ED95 

ED95 designates a blend of 95% ethanol and 5% ignition improver; it is used in modified diesel engines where high compression is used to ignite the fuel, as opposed to the operation of gasoline engines, where spark plugs are used. This fuel was developed by Swedish ethanol producer SEKAB. Because of the high ignition temperatures of pure ethanol, the addition of ignition improver is necessary for successful diesel engine operation. A diesel engine running on ethanol also has a higher compression ratio and an adapted fuel system.

This fuel has been used with success in many Swedish Scania buses since 1985, which has produced around 700 ethanol buses, more than 600 of them to Swedish cities, and more recently has also delivered ethanol buses for commercial service in Great Britain, Spain, Italy, Belgium, and Norway. As of June 2010 Stockholm has the largest ethanol ED95 bus fleet in the world.

As of 2010, the Swedish ED95 engine is in its third generation and already has complied with Euro 5 emission standards, without any kind of post-treatment of the exhaust gases. The ethanol-powered engine is also being certified as environmentally enhanced vehicle (EEV) in the Stockholm municipality. The EEV rule still has no date to enter into force in Europe and is stricter than the Euro 5 standard.

Nottingham became the first city in England to operate a regular bus service with ethanol-fuelled vehicles. Three ED95 single-deck buses entered regular service in the city in March 2008. Soon after, Reading also introduced ED95 double-deck buses.

Under the auspices of the BioEthanol for Sustainable Transport project, more than 138 bioethanol ED95 buses were part of demonstration trial at four cities, three in Europe, and one in Brazil, between 2006 and 2009. A total of 127 ED95 buses operated in Stockholm, five buses operated in Madrid, three in La Spezia, and one in Brazil.
In Brazil, the first Scania ED95 bus with a modified diesel engine was introduced as a trial in São Paulo city in December 2007, and since November 2009, two ED95 buses were in regular service. The Brazilian trial project ran for three years and performance and emissions were monitored by the National Reference Center on Biomass (CENBIO- ) at the Universidade de São Paulo.

In November 2010, the municipal government of São Paulo city signed an agreement with UNICA, Cosan, Scania and  Viação Metropolitana, a local bus operator, to introduced a fleet of 50 ethanol-powered ED95 buses by May 2011. Scania manufactures the bus engine and chassis in its plant located in São Bernardo do Campo, São Paulo, using the same technology and fuel as the ED95 buses already operating in Stockholm. The bus body is a Brazilian CAIO. The first ethanol-powered buses were delivered in May 2011, and the 50 buses will start regular service in June 2011 in the southern region of São Paulo. The 50 ED95 buses had a cost of R$ 20 million and due to the higher cost of the ED95 fuel and the lower energy content of ethanol as compared to diesel, one of the firms participating in the cooperation agreement, Raísen (a joint venture between Royal Dutch Shell and Cosan), supplies the fuel to the municipality at 70% of the market price of regular diesel.

E100 

E100 is pure ethanol fuel. Straight hydrous ethanol as an automotive fuel has been widely used in Brazil since the late 1970s for neat ethanol vehicles and more recently for flexible-fuel vehicles. The ethanol fuel used in Brazil is distilled close to the azeotrope mixture of 95.63% ethanol and 4.37% water (by weight) which is approximately 3.5% water by volume.
The azeotrope is the highest concentration of ethanol that can be achieved by simple fractional distillation.  The maximum water concentration according to the ANP specification is 4.9 vol.% (approximately 6.1 weight%)  The E nomenclature is not adopted in Brazil, but hydrated ethanol can be tagged as E100, meaning it does not have any gasoline, because the water content is not an additive, but rather a residue from the distillation process. However,  straight hydrous ethanol is also called E95 by some authors.

The first commercial vehicle capable of running on pure ethanol was the Ford Model T, produced from 1908 through 1927. It was fitted with a carburetor with adjustable jetting, allowing use of gasoline or ethanol, or a combination of both. At that time, other car manufacturers also provided engines for ethanol fuel use. Thereafter, and as a response to the 1973 and 1979 energy crises, the first modern vehicle capable of running with pure hydrous ethanol (E100) was launched in the Brazilian market, the Fiat 147, after testing with several prototypes developed by the Brazilian subsidiaries of Fiat, Volkswagen, General Motors and Ford. , there were 1.1 million neat ethanol vehicles still in use in Brazil. Since 2003, Brazilian newer flex-fuel vehicles are capable of running on pure hydrous ethanol (E100) or blended with any combination of E20 to E27.5 gasoline (a mixture made with anhydrous ethanol), the national mandatory blend. , there were 17.1 million flexible-fuel vehicles running on Brazilian roads.

E100 imposes a limitation on normal vehicle operation, as ethanol's lower evaporative pressure (as compared to gasoline) causes problems when cold starting the engine at temperatures below . For this reason, both pure ethanol and E100 flex-fuel vehicles are built with an additional small gasoline reservoir inside the engine compartment to help in starting the engine when cold by initially injecting gasoline. Once started, the engine is then switched back to ethanol. The Polo E-Flex, launched in March 2009, was the first flex-fuel model without an auxiliary tank for cold start. The warming system, called Flex Start, was developed by Robert Bosch GmbH.

Swedish carmakers have developed ethanol-only capable engines for the new Saab Aero X BioPower 100 Concept E100, with a V6 engine which is fuelled entirely by E100 bioethanol, and the limited edition of the Koenigsegg CCXR, a version of the CCX converted to use E85 or E100, as well as standard 98-octane gasoline, and currently the fastest and most powerful flex-fuel vehicle with its twin-supercharged V8 producing 1018 hp when running on biofuel, as compared to 806 hp on 91-octane unleaded gasoline.

The higher fuel efficiency of E100 (compared to methanol) in high performance race cars resulted in Indianapolis 500 races in 2007 and 2008 being run on 100% fuel-grade ethanol.

Use limitations

Modifications to engines
The use of ethanol blends in conventional gasoline vehicles is restricted to low mixtures, as ethanol-gasoline is corrosive and can degrade some of the materials in the engine and fuel system. Also, the engine has to be adjusted for a higher compression ratio as compared to a pure gasoline engine to take advantage of ethanol's higher oxygen content, thus allowing an improvement in fuel efficiency and a reduction of tailpipe emissions. The following table shows the required modifications to gasoline engines to run smoothly and without degrading any materials. This information is based on the modifications made by the Brazilian automotive industry at the beginning of the ethanol program in that country in the late 1970s, and reflects the experience of Volkswagen do Brasil.

Disadvantages to ethanol fuel blends when used in engines designed exclusively for gasoline include lowered fuel mileage, metal corrosion, deterioration of plastic and rubber fuel system components, clogged fuel systems, fuel injectors, and carburetors, delamination of composite fuel tanks, varnish buildup on engine parts, damaged or destroyed internal engine components, water absorption, fuel phase separation, and shortened fuel storage life.  Many major auto, marine, motorcycle, lawn equipment, generator, and other internal combustion engine manufacturers have issued warnings and precautions about the use of ethanol-blended gasolines of any type in their engines, and the Federal Aviation Administration and major aviation engine manufacturers have prohibited the use of automotive gasolines blended with ethanol in light aircraft due to safety issues from fuel system and engine damage.

Other disadvantages

See also 

 Butanol fuel
 Ethanol fuel
 Ethanol fuel energy balance
 Ethanol fuel in Brazil
 Biofuel in Sweden
 Ethanol fuel in the United States
 Food vs. fuel
 Indirect land use change impacts of biofuels
 List of flexible-fuel vehicles by car manufacturer
List of gasoline additives

Notes

References

External links 
 Bioenergywiki: Renewable fuel targets at bioenergywiki. See here a complete list of mandatory blends that will go into effect in several countries and regions in 2010 and thereafter
 2011 NACS Annual Fuels Report

Ethanol fuel
Petroleum products